The bluenose shiner (Pteronotropis welaka) is a species of freshwater fish in the family Cyprinidae.
It is found only in the United States, mostly in Florida and parts of Alabama and Georgia; its habitat is deep, slow-moving coastal creeks and small to medium rivers and prefers deep pools than shallow areas.

It is found in Pearl River, Apalachicola River and St. Johns River  but it is apparently not found in Escatawpa River and Perdido River. It is known to have a fragmented population and so has a spotty distribution in Chipola River, Choctawhatchee River, Yellow River, Conecuh River, Alabama River and Tombigbee River. The population is very poorly known with it being rare in the western panhandle of Florida, decline from the past 10 years in Mississippi and "ever decreasing" in Alabama.

In 2013, the conservation status was changed from Data Deficient to Vulnerable. It is threatened by streamside vegetation removal for agricultural and urban development and overcollection for the aquarium trade.

References

Pteronotropis
Fish described in 1898
Fish of the United States
Cyprinid fish of North America
Taxonomy articles created by Polbot